Jeff Perrett (born March 23, 1984) is a former Canadian football offensive tackle. Aside from spending the final off-season (2017) of his career with the Toronto Argonauts, Perrett spent the rest of his CFL career (2006-2016) with the Montreal Alouettes. He was drafted by the Montreal Alouettes in the third round of the 2006 CFL Draft. Perrett appeared in 166 regular-season games with Montreal and helped the team win two Grey Cups during his tenure. He played college football for the Tulsa Golden Hurricane. Perrett was the East Division nominee for the CFL's Most Outstanding Offensive Lineman Award in 2014, winning the Leo Dandurand Trophy. On May 1, 2017, at the age of 33, Perret announced his retirement from professional football.

Perrett is a Latter-day Saint.

References

External links
Montreal Alouettes bio
Toronto Argonauts bio

1984 births
Canadian football offensive linemen
Canadian Latter Day Saints
Living people
Montreal Alouettes players
Players of Canadian football from Alberta
Sportspeople from Lethbridge
Toronto Argonauts players
Tulsa Golden Hurricane football players